This is a sortable list of the percentage of the party vote each party received in each individual electorate in the 2005 New Zealand general election.

References
New Zealand Parliament Electorate Profiles

2005 New Zealand general election